The Ministry of Agriculture, Livestock and Fisheries was a former ministry of the Government of Tanzania.

History 
The Ministry was formed by the amalgamation of the former Ministry of Agriculture, Food Security and Cooperatives and Ministry of Livestock and Fisheries Development in John Magufuli's first cabinet.

The ministry was split again into two similar ministries in October 2017 to improve efficiency, creating the Ministry of Agriculture and Ministry of Livestock and Fisheries.

Ministers

References 

A
Tanzania
Agricultural organisations based in Tanzania